Varese Casbeno railway station serves the neighborhood of Casbeno, in the city and comune of Varese, in the region of Lombardy, northern Italy. It is located on the Saronno–Laveno railway. The station is currently managed by Ferrovienord (FN). Train services are operated by the lombard railway company Trenord.

Location
Varese Casbeno railway station is situated at Piazzale Antonio Meucci, in the neighbourhood of Casbeno, in the south of the city. It should not be confused with the town's other railway stations, Varese and Varese Nord.

Movement
The station is served by cadenced  regional trains operated by Trenord as part of the service contract entered into with the government of the Lombardy Region.

See also

History of rail transport in Italy
List of railway stations in Lombardy
Rail transport in Italy
Railway stations in Italy
Casbeno

References

External links

Description of Varese Casbeno railway station on the operator's official website 

Railway stations in Varese
Railway stations opened in 1886